In probability theory, inverse probability is an obsolete term for the probability distribution of an unobserved variable.

Today, the problem of determining an unobserved variable (by whatever method) is called inferential statistics, the method of inverse probability (assigning a probability distribution to an unobserved variable) is called Bayesian probability, the "distribution" of data given the unobserved variable is rather the likelihood function (which is not a probability distribution), and the distribution of an unobserved variable, given both data and a prior distribution, is the posterior distribution.

The term "inverse probability" appears in an 1837 paper of De Morgan, in reference to Laplace's method of probability (developed in a 1774 paper, which independently discovered and popularized Bayesian methods, and a 1812 book), though the term "inverse probability" does not occur in these. The term "Bayesian", which displaced "inverse probability", was introduced by Ronald Fisher in 1950. Inverse probability, variously interpreted, was the dominant approach to statistics until the development of frequentism in the early 20th century by Ronald Fisher, Jerzy Neyman and Egon Pearson. Following the development of frequentism, the terms frequentist and Bayesian developed to contrast these approaches, and became common in the 1950s.

Details 
In modern terms, given a probability distribution p(x|θ) for an observable quantity x conditional on an unobserved variable θ, the "inverse probability" is the posterior distribution p(θ|x), which depends both on the likelihood function (the inversion of the probability distribution) and a prior distribution. The distribution p(x|θ) itself is called the direct probability.

The inverse probability problem (in the 18th and 19th centuries) was the problem of estimating a parameter from experimental data in the experimental sciences, especially astronomy and biology. A simple example would be the problem of estimating the position of a star in the sky (at a certain time on a certain date) for purposes of navigation. Given the data, one must estimate the true position (probably by averaging). This problem would now be considered one of inferential statistics.

The terms "direct probability" and "inverse probability" were in use until the middle part of the 20th century, when the terms "likelihood function" and "posterior distribution" became prevalent.

See also
Bayesian probability 
Bayes' theorem

References

 
 See reprint in 
 
 

Statistical inference
Probability interpretations
Bayesian statistics